Miss Philippines Earth 2001 (also called Miss Philippines 2001) was the 1st edition of Miss Philippines Earth. It took place at the University of the Philippines Theater in Quezon City, Philippines on April 28, 2001.

At the end of the event, Carlene Aguilar was crowned as the first ever winner of Miss Philippines Earth. With her crowned are the runners-up: Maria del Carmen Antigua was named First Runner-Up, Anjelly Gamboa was named Second Runner-Up, Marites Orjalesa was named Third Runner-Up, and Gemma Gatdula was named Fourth Runner-Up.

The coronation night presentation show was opened with the Miss Earth theme song entitled "Woman of the Earth" written by Dero Pedero.

Results
Color keys
  The contestant was a Semi-Finalist in an International pageant.

Special Awards
The following is a list of the special award winners:

 Major Awards
 Minor/Sponsor Awards

Contestants
24 contestants competed for the title.

Judges
The board of judges led by Metro Manila Development Authority (MMDA) Chairman Benjamin Abalos. Other judges in the pageant include Environment Secretary Heherson Alvarez, actress Chin-Chin Gutierrez and lawyer Katrina Legarda.

References

2001
2001 beauty pageants
2001 in the Philippines
April 2001 events in the Philippines